The Vampire by Night (Nina Price) is a fictional character that appears in comic books published by Marvel Comics. She is the niece to Jack Russell and has the ability to shapeshift into either a werewolf or a vampiress between dusk and dawn.

Publication history

She first appeared in Amazing Fantasy #10 (September 2005) and was created by writer Jeff Parker and artist Federica Manfredi.

Fictional character biography
Through her mother's bloodline, Nina became part of a long family curse. This curse had originated with Nina's 18th-century ancestor Grigori, who had been tainted by the Darkhold, a grimoire of black magic, and was subsequently bitten by a werewolf who served Dracula. Because of this, all the descendants of Grigori were cursed to transform into werewolves upon their 18th birthday. Nina's mother, Lissa Russell, was a victim of the curse until an altercation with a sorcerer named Doctor Glitternight altered her standing and she was freed from becoming a werewolf. Lissa then married a wealthy business tycoon named Mr. Price and gave birth to Nina. Although her mother was able to alter the curse's path against her, the curse continued its course to Nina. At some point Nina was attacked and bitten by a vampire, who attempted to turn her into one of the undead. This attack altered the curse for Nina somewhat and caused her to exhibit traits of both werewolves and vampires. By day Nina Price seems to be a normal human, but once the sun goes down, she turns into a vampire. Due to the werewolf curse, Nina also transformed into a white wolf during the full moon, and she used her father's money and status to reserve a zoo or park in which she would cage herself until the full moon was over and she was no longer an animal (so she would not hurt innocents). However, Nina had no problem using her supernatural abilities to harm criminals, as she found them acceptable targets for her vampiric thirsts, feeding on rapists and thieves once the sun went down.

Falling in a trap set by S.H.I.E.L.D. during an adventure with her Uncle Jack, Nina soon after became a reluctant member of S.H.I.E.L.D.'s Paranormal Containment Unit, nicknamed the Howling Commandos. Working at a secret military installation called Area 13, Nina was placed as part of a supernatural team working for the government set to handle situations that dealt with more of the macabre side of life. During her time there she was partnered with another werewolf named Warwolf (real name Vince Marcus) and fellow vampires Lilith, the daughter of Dracula.

As part of the All-New, All-Different Marvel event, Nina becomes a member of S.T.A.K.E.'s Howling Commandos.

Nina later ends up under the thrall of Dracula at the time when Old Man Logan and the Howling Commandos arrived to rescue Jubilee, who is also under Dracula's thrall. Both of them end up freed from Dracula's thrall upon his defeat.

Powers and abilities
Nina is a hybrid of a vampire and a werewolf and possesses the abilities of both, but only after sunset. Her vampire powers make her supernaturally strong and fast and unable to cast a reflection in a mirror. Her vampiric nature also makes her image unable to be captured on film (which makes it impossible for people to take her picture at night). She can hypnotize people with her stare, an ability she often uses to immobilize her prey. Like a normal vampire, she must feed on human blood, but she focuses her thirst on criminals. Due to her hybrid nature, sunlight is not lethal to Nina (as it is to most vampires) and she heals amazingly quickly from even the most serious of injuries.

She is also cursed with the power of lycanthropy. When the moon is full, she transforms into a wolf. Unlike her Uncle Jack, she does not become a humanoid werewolf, but an actual white wolf (strongly resembling an Arctic wolf). In her bestial state, Nina has superhuman senses of hearing and smell, powerful jaws and deadly fangs and claws. She is also overwhelmed by the wolf's feral instincts and often shuts herself away from others to prevent her from killing innocent people.

Reception
 In 2021, Screen Rant included Nina Price in their "Marvel: 10 Most Powerful Vampires" list.

In other media
 The Vampire by Night appears in Hulk: Where Monsters Dwell, voiced by Chiara Zanni. This version is a member of the Howling Commandos.
 The Vampire by Night appeared as an unlockable playable character in Marvel Avengers Academy.

References

External links
 Vampire by Night at Marvel.com
 Vampire by Night at Comic Vine
 Vampire by Night at Marvel Appendix

Fictional characters with immortality
Fictional characters with superhuman senses
Fictional half-vampires
Fictional hypnotists and indoctrinators
Fictional therianthropes
Fictional werewolves
Marvel Comics characters who are shapeshifters
Marvel Comics characters who can move at superhuman speeds
Marvel Comics characters with accelerated healing
Marvel Comics characters with superhuman strength
Marvel Comics female superheroes
Marvel Comics vampires
S.H.I.E.L.D. agents
Howling Commandos
Marvel Comics hybrids